The Tenerife Group of Independents (ATI) was a Spanish political party based in the island of Tenerife, Canary Islands, that existed from March 1983 until its integration into Canarian Coalition.

References

Political parties in the Canary Islands
Political parties established in 1983
Political parties disestablished in 2005
Regionalist parties in Spain
1983 establishments in Spain
2005 disestablishments in Spain
Canarian nationalist parties